The 1932 Newfoundland general election was held on 11 June 1932 to elect members of the 28th General Assembly of Newfoundland. This vote proved to be the final general election held by the Dominion of Newfoundland. As a result of a riot which occurred in 1932 due to Newfoundland's deteriorating economic situation, Prime Minister Sir Richard Squires dissolved the House of Assembly and called an election. His Liberals were reduced to two seats while Frederick C. Alderdice's United Newfoundland Party won 24 seats and was elected to government.  The size of the House was reduced from 40 to 27 as an economy measure.

Alderdice was not able to rescue the public finances. By this time Newfoundlanders despaired of the ability of their politicians to solve the problems. The British government commissioned a report from William Warrender Mackenzie, 1st Baron Amulree which was scathing about the political culture of Newfoundland.

The price of British government financial aid was the abandonment of responsible and representative government. The legislature was dissolved. The Commission of Government came into operation on 16 February 1934 ending more than a century of legislative democracy in Newfoundland.

Results

Results by party 

*As Liberal-Conservative Progressive Party

Elected members 
 Bonavista North
 William C. Winsor United Newfoundland Party
 Bonavista South
 Herman W. Quinton United Newfoundland Party
 Burgeo-LaPoile
 James A. Winter United Newfoundland Party (speaker)
 Burin
 Samuel J. Foote United Newfoundland Party
 Carbonear-Bay de Verde
 John C. Puddester United Newfoundland Party
 Ferryland
 Michael A. Shea United Newfoundland Party
 Fogo
 Harold J. Earle United Newfoundland Party
 Fortune Bay and Hermitage
 Harris M. Mosdell Independent
 Grand Falls
 Kenneth M. Brown United Newfoundland Party
 Green Bay
 Roland G. Starkes Liberal
 Harbour Grace
 Harry A. Winter United Newfoundland Party
 Harbour Main-Bell Island
 Charles Furey United Newfoundland Party
 William J. Browne United Newfoundland Party
 Humber
 F. Gordon Bradley Liberal
 Placentia and St. Mary's
 Phillip J. Lewis United Newfoundland Party
 Placentia West
 William J. Walsh United Newfoundland Party
 Port de Grave
 James S. Ayre United Newfoundland Party
 St. Barbe
 George Whitely United Newfoundland Party
 St. George's-Port au Port
 William H. Abbott United Newfoundland Party
 St. John's East
 Gerald G. Byrne United Newfoundland Party
 L. Edward Emerson United Newfoundland Party
 St. John's West
 Frederick C. Alderdice United Newfoundland Party
 Patrick F. Halley United Newfoundland Party
 Trinity North
 John G. Stone United Newfoundland Party
 Trinity South
 Harold Mitchell United Newfoundland Party
 Twillingate
 Norman Gray United Newfoundland Party
 White Bay
 Joseph Moore United Newfoundland Party

References

External links

See also
General elections in Newfoundland (pre-Confederation)

1932
1932 elections in North America
1932 elections in Canada
Politics of the Dominion of Newfoundland
1932 in Newfoundland
June 1932 events